Bruce Norris is the name of:

Bruce Norris (ice hockey) (1924–1986), former owner of the Detroit Red Wings
Bruce Norris (playwright) (born 1960), American actor and playwright
Bruce Norris (character), a character from the CHERUB book series